Elections to Watford Borough Council were held on 10 June 2004. One third of the council was up for election and the Liberal Democrat party kept overall control of the council. Overall turnout was 39.3%.

After the election, the composition of the council was:
Liberal Democrat 26
Labour 4
Conservative 4
Green 2

Council election result

Ward results

References
2004 Watford election result
Ward results
Local Elections: Watford

2004
2004 English local elections
2000s in Hertfordshire